The Houston Texans are a professional American football team based in Houston. The Texans compete in the National Football League as a member club of the American Football Conference (AFC) South division, and play their home games at NRG Stadium.

The Texans were founded in 1999, and were owned by Bob McNair until his death in 2018; following McNair's death, the majority ownership of the team went to his wife, Janice. The team replaced the city's previous NFL franchise, the Houston Oilers, who played from 1960 to 1996 before moving to Nashville and eventually becoming the Tennessee Titans.

While the Texans mainly struggled in the 2000s, their fortunes would take a turn for the better in the 2010s when they first found success in the 2011 season, winning their first division championship and clinching their first playoff berth. The Texans have gone on to win five more AFC South division championships in 2012, 2015, 2016, 2018, and 2019. They are the only franchise to have never won a road playoff game along with the only one to have never appeared in a conference championship game; they are also one of four franchises to have never appeared in a Super Bowl, alongside the Cleveland Browns, Detroit Lions, and division rival Jacksonville Jaguars.

Franchise history

In 1997, Houston entrepreneur Bob McNair had a failed bid to bring a National Hockey League (NHL) expansion team to the city, and Bud Adams relocated the city's NFL team, the Houston Oilers, to Nashville, Tennessee, where they were renamed the Tennessee Titans in 1999. In 1996, the Cleveland Browns had controversially relocated to become the Baltimore Ravens. As part of the settlement between the NFL, the city of Cleveland, and the team owned by Art Modell, the league promised to return football to Cleveland within the next three years.

In order to even out the franchises to 32, the NFL contemplated adding another expansion franchise. As Houston was one of the favorites for the extra franchise, along with Toronto and Los Angeles (the latter of whom had lost the Rams and the Raiders in 1995), McNair then decided to join the football project and founded Houston NFL Holdings with partner Steve Patterson. With Houston Livestock Show and Rodeo, they would push for a domed stadium as part of the bid to lure the NFL back to Houston. On October 6, 1999, the WNFL awarded the 32nd team to Houston at a cost of $700 million.

In the process of naming the new franchise leadership conducted an extensive review and research process; the final list of names was determined after several months of research conducted jointly by Houston NFL 2002 and NFL Properties. This included an online survey asking fans and the community to weigh in which received more than 65,000 responses in one week. On March 2, 2000, it was announced that the team name search had been narrowed down to five choices: Apollos, Bobcats, Stallions, Texans, and Wildcatters. On September 6, 2000, the NFL's 32nd franchise was officially christened the Houston Texans before thousands at a downtown rally in Houston. McNair explained that the name and logo were chosen to "embody the pride, strength, independence and achievement that make the people of Houston and our area special." The name "Texans" had been used by several now-defunct football teams, including the Canadian Football League franchise in San Antonio; the World Football League franchise in Houston, which moved to Louisiana to become the Shreveport Steamer; the Dallas Texans of the NFL which played in only the 1952 season; and by the precursor of the present-day Kansas City Chiefs, when they were the second incarnation of the Dallas Texans in the American Football League (AFL). Owner Bob McNair received permission from Chiefs' owner Lamar Hunt to use the Texans name for his new team. It is also a subtle homage to the naming style of the NHL team the Montreal Canadiens who also named their team after their respective demonym.

McNair family era (2002–present) 
The Houston Texans joined the NFL in the 2002 season, playing at the newly opened Reliant Stadium under head coach Dom Capers. With their opening game victory over the Dallas Cowboys on September 8, 2002, the Texans became the first expansion team to win its opening game since the Minnesota Vikings beat the Chicago Bears in 1961.

Gary Kubiak years (2006–2013) 
While the team struggled in its early seasons, results began to improve when native Houstonian Gary Kubiak became the head coach in 2006. The Texans finished with a .500 season (8–8) in 2007 and 2008, and nearly qualified for the 2009–10 playoffs with a 9–7 result in 2009. The Texans started the 2010 season on a 4–2 record going into a Week 7 bye week, but promptly collapsed 2–8 in the second half of the season, finishing 6–10. In the 2011 NFL Draft, the Texans acquired Wisconsin star defensive end J. J. Watt 11th overall. The following season, former Cowboys head coach Wade Phillips was hired as the defensive coordinator for the Texans, and the improved defense led to them finishing 10–6, winning their first AFC South title. The Texans then beat wild card Cincinnati Bengals 31–10 in the first round of the 2011–12 playoffs, before a 20–13 defeat by the Ravens in the Divisional Round.

However, they lost three of their last four games to finish 12–4; beating the rival Indianapolis Colts in that four-game stretch allowing them to clinch their 2nd AFC South title. The Texans beat the Bengals again in the wild-card round, but they lost in the Divisional Round to the New England Patriots.

In the 2013 NFL Draft, the Texans acquired Clemson wide receiver DeAndre Hopkins 27th overall. In 2013, the Texans started 2–0 but went into a tailspin and lost every game afterwards. Kubiak was fired as head coach after being swept by the rival Jacksonville Jaguars, who themselves started 0–8. Wade Phillips filled in as head coach, but the Texans' poor form did not change, and they finished 2–14, tying, with 2005, their worst record in franchise history. The 14-game losing streak is the worst in franchise history.

Bill O'Brien years (2014–2020) 
The Texans entered the 2014 season with a 14-game losing streak. Former Penn State head coach Bill O'Brien became the Texans' new head coach, and the third in franchise history, during the offseason. In 2014, the Texans won three of their first four games, defeating the Redskins in the season opener, the Raiders, and the Bills, losing to the New York Giants. They lost three of their next four games, losing to the Dallas Cowboys, the Indianapolis Colts, and the Pittsburgh Steelers, respectively. The Texans went on to finish 9–7 in the 2014 season and barely missed the playoffs.

In the 2015 season, they were featured on HBO, on the show "Hard Knocks". That year, the Texans started with a 2–5 record. Quarterback Ryan Mallett was released amidst controversy regarding his benching in favor of Brian Hoyer during a loss against the Indianapolis Colts. After a poor start, the Texans finished with a 9–7 record and won their third AFC South title. However, they were shut out by the Kansas City Chiefs in the Wild Card round 30–0, ending their championship hopes for the year.

On March 9, 2016, the Texans signed former Denver Broncos quarterback Brock Osweiler to a 4-year, $72 million deal. Despite Osweiler's lucrative deal, he struggled significantly during the 2016 season. After throwing two interceptions in Week 15 against the Jaguars, coach Bill O'Brien benched the offseason acquisition in favor of backup quarterback Tom Savage. Savage led a comeback effort against the Jaguars, and was named the starter for the remainder of the season. The Texans clinched their fourth AFC South division title in six years in Savage's first career start against the Bengals in Week 16. They defeated the wildcard Oakland Raiders 27–14 in the opening round of the playoffs with Osweiler as the starting quarterback due to Savage being out with a concussion. Osweiler started in the Divisional Playoffs game against the New England Patriots, throwing three interceptions in the second half. The Texans lost 34–16.

In the 2017 NFL Draft, the Texans traded up to the 12th overall selection to select Clemson star quarterback Deshaun Watson. Watson started six games his rookie year, going 3–3 and having arguably the greatest and most decorated rookie season by a quarterback in NFL history, eventually rising up to become the Texans' franchise quarterback. However, his success would come up very short, following a Week 8 41–38 loss to the Seattle Seahawks, Watson tore his ACL in practice and was ruled out the remainder of the season, which caused the Texans to have one of their worst seasons. Plagued by a series of unexpected injuries (including a second consecutive season-ending injury to J. J. Watt) and controversy involving the team's suspected violation of the league's concussion protocol, after backup quarterback Tom Savage suffered a seizure following a Week 14 game against the San Francisco 49ers, the Texans went 1–9 the rest of the season and eventually finish 4–12 and last in the AFC South in 2017, missing the playoffs for the first time since 2014 and giving Bill O'Brien his first losing season as Texans head coach.

In 2018, the Texans started the season 0–3, losing by a combined 15 points to the New England Patriots, Tennessee Titans, and New York Giants, before winning a 37–34 overtime shootout on the road in Indianapolis. This win sparked a nine-game winning streak for the Texans, their first since starting 5–0 in 2012, which included a Week 8 win against the Miami Dolphins that included five touchdown passes from Deshaun Watson. This streak was the longest ever for a team that started the season 0–3; the previous record was a seven-game win-streak set by the New York Giants in 1918 after starting out 0–3.

On November 23, 2018, the owner of the Houston Texans, Bob McNair, died from skin cancer. On November 26, 2018, McNair's wife, Janice McNair, became the principal owner and Senior Chair of the Houston Texans, while their son, D. Cal McNair, became the Chairman and Chief Operating Officer.

The Texans finished the season 11–5, and won another AFC South division championship under Bill O'Brien. They then lost 21–7 in the first round of the playoffs to their AFC South division rival Indianapolis Colts.

In 2019, the Texans won the AFC South division championship and qualified for the NFL playoffs on the back of a 10–6 record. They went on to defeat the Buffalo Bills by a score of 22–19 in overtime in the AFC wild-card round. However, the Texans' 2019 season came to an end the following week, as they lost to the eventual Super Bowl champion Kansas City Chiefs by a score of 51–31 in the AFC divisional round.

On March 22, 2020, the Texans traded away all-pro wide receiver DeAndre Hopkins and a fourth-round pick in the 2020 NFL Draft to the Arizona Cardinals. In return, Houston received running back David Johnson, a 2020 second-round pick, and a 2021 fourth-round pick. The move was confusing and controversial among fans and sportswriters alike, as many claimed that the Texans should have received more valuable assets for Hopkins, who was among the best receivers in the NFL.

The Texans began the 2020 NFL season with a record of 0–4, and Bill O'Brien was consequentially fired following a disappointing loss to the Minnesota Vikings in Week 4. Romeo Crennel, who was the head coach of the Cleveland Browns from 2005 to 2008 and of the Kansas City Chiefs in 2011–12, was named the interim head coach for the remainder of the season. Crennel managed to win more than half of his first 7 games as Houston's head coach, giving Houston a record of 4–7. However, the Texans ended the season on a 5-game losing streak. With a final record of 4–12, the Texans were unable to make the playoffs.

Rebuilding years (2021–present) 

On January 27, 2021, the Texans hired David Culley as the team's head coach. Culley most recently worked as the Baltimore Ravens assistant head coach, wide receivers coach and passing game coordinator. On February 12, 2021, the Texans released all-pro defensive end J.J. Watt. It was confirmed that Watt personally requested owner Cal McNair for his release.

On January 13, 2022, the Texans fired David Culley. as the team's head coach and promoted defensive coordinator Lovie Smith as the team's fifth head coach on February 7, 2022. The team traded away their starting quarterback Deshaun Watson to the Cleveland Browns and a 2024 fifth round pick for three 1st round picks, a 3rd round pick and a 4th round pick on March 20, 2022. The Texans opened their 2022 season in a tie game against the Indianapolis Colts, the franchise’s first tie in their 20 year existence. On January 9, 2023, the Texans announced that they were going in a different direction by firing Lovie Smith.

Rivalries
The Texans are the youngest expansion team in the NFL, having only been competing in the NFL since 2002. For that reason, they have not had the history or the reputation on which to build classic rivalries like the ones that often exist between older franchises. Despite this, the team has developed some rivalries. Its natural rivals are its fellow AFC South teams such as the Tennessee Titans, Jacksonville Jaguars, and Indianapolis Colts.

Tennessee Titans

The Tennessee Titans, who were formerly the Houston Oilers before their relocation in 1996, are viewed by many Houston fans as the Texans' chief rival as members of the AFC South ever since the early 2000s.

Indianapolis Colts

Ever since the early 2000s, the Texans also have an AFC South Division rivalry with the Indianapolis Colts, whom the Texans had not defeated until the 2006 season. The first time that the Texans would sweep the Colts was in the 2016 NFL season. More recently, Houston has increased bitterness with the Indianapolis Colts due to their young Houston-native quarterback Andrew Luck having been drafted by the Colts in 2012 and the franchise's first ever sweep of the Colts against Luck in 2016. In 2018 the two teams met in the AFC Wild Card Playoffs, with the Colts winning 21–7.

Dallas Cowboys

The Texans also have an intrastate/interconference rivalry with the Dallas Cowboys, with whom they contest the so-called Governor's Cup every year (a tradition started between the cities prior to the Oilers relocating) either in the preseason or the regular season for bragging rights in the state of Texas. In 2017, the destruction and flooding caused during Hurricane Harvey a few days before their Week 4 pre-season match up time scheduled caused the game to be relocated to AT&T Stadium in Arlington, Texas. However, out of concern for the safety of the fans and the condition of the player's families & communities, the game was canceled.

Logo and uniforms
Along with the team name, McNair unveiled the team logo, an abstract depiction of a bull's head, split in such a way to resemble the flag of Texas and the state of Texas, including a lone star to stand for the eye, the five points of which representing pride, courage, strength, tradition and independence. McNair described the colors as "Deep Steel Blue", "Battle Red" and "Liberty White". A year later the Texans unveiled their uniforms during another downtown rally.

The Texans' helmet is dark blue with the Texans bull logo. The helmet was initially white when the team name and logo were unveiled, but was later changed to dark blue. The uniform design consists of red trim and either dark blue or white jerseys. The team typically wears white pants with its blue jerseys and blue pants with its white jerseys. Starting with the 2006 season, the Texans wore all-white for their home opener, and the team began to wear an all-blue combination for home games vs. the Indianapolis Colts. In 2003, the Texans introduced an alternative red jersey with blue trim; they wear this jersey at one home game each year, usually against a division rival. In 2007, the Texans introduced red pants for the first time, pairing them with the red jerseys for an all-red look. (This uniform combination was not well-received and has since been retired). In October 2008 the Texans paired blue socks (instead of the traditional red) with their blue pants and white jerseys, eventually becoming the team's primary road uniform combination. In 2016, the Texans unveiled a new uniform combo against the Jacksonville Jaguars, pairing the red jersey with blue pants and red socks. In 2017, the Texans unveiled a Color Rush uniform, using an all-blue uniform but with minimal white elements. In 2022, the Texans began using an alternate red helmet, worn exclusively with the red jerseys.

In 2002, the team wore a patch commemorating their inaugural season. Also, they celebrated 10 years as a franchise by wearing an anniversary patch throughout 2012. From 2018 to 2019, the Texans wore a memorial patch to honor Bob McNair after his death.

Players of note

Current roster

NFL Draft history

First-round draft picks by year

Awards and honors

Ring of Honor
On November 19, 2017, Andre Johnson was the first-ever inductee into the Texans Ring of Honor. On October 6, 2019, Bob McNair was posthumously the second inductee into the Texans Ring of Honor.

Pro Football Hall of Fame
Only one member of the Pro Football Hall of Fame has spent any portion of their career with Texans. This is due in part to the requirements to be inducted and the Texans only having been established in 2002.

Staff and head coaches

Staff

Head coaches

Culture and community

Traditions
Battle Red Day – On Battle Red Day the team wears the red alternate jerseys and fans are encouraged to wear red to the game. Starting in 2007 and including 2008, this included the Texans wearing red pants along with the red jerseys.
Liberty White-Out – On Liberty White-Out Day One the team wears the road white jerseys and white pants. Fans are encouraged to also wear white to the game.
Bull Pen – The sections behind the north end zone of NRG/Reliant Stadium are known as the Bull Pen. Some of the most avid Texans fans attend games in the Bull Pen and regular members have helped create and implement fan traditions, songs and chants, such as:
Holding up giant Texans jerseys while the visiting team's players are announced
Turning their backs on the opposing team after they score
Tailgating in the purple lot, the parking zone with the most barbecue for sale by fans and vendors 
Gathering as a group for tailgating in the NW corner of the Platinum Lot of Reliant Stadium at the "Blue Crew" tailgate and conducting the Bull Pen Toast every game approximately an hour and a half prior to kickoff
Walking in the HEB Holiday Parade on Thanksgiving Day
Visiting the Bull Pen Pub for TORO Wraps, cheerleader autographs and to listen and dance with the Bull Pen Pep Band
Bull Pen Pep Band – 45-member musical group that performs at all Houston Texans home games.
 Pre-Kickoff Tradition – Before each kickoff at a home game, the Texans will run a short clip of a raging bull thrashing the opponent of the week. The video is paired with the AC/DC song "Thunderstruck". 
 Player Introduction – When the players are introduced before the game, the announcer says the player's first name and the crowd yells out the last name (e.g. The announcer will say "Defensive End J. J...." and the crowd will yell out "WATT!!!").

Mascots and cheerleaders
The team's official mascot is Toro, an anthropomorphic blue bull. The team also has a cheerleading squad simply named the Houston Texans Cheerleaders.

Community outreach
Community outreach by the Houston Texans is primarily operated by the Houston Texans Foundation, who works with multiple community partners. The Houston Texans organization is also a supporter of the character education program, Heart of a Champion. In 2017, the 15th annual Houston Texans Charity Golf Classic raised more than $380,000 for the Foundation. More than $27.2 million has been raised for the Foundation since its creation in 2002.

Former Texans DE J. J. Watt raised $41.6 million in relief funds for Hurricane Harvey after the storm devastated the city in 2017.

In January 2023, the Houston Texans, agreed to purchase carbon credits from Occidental Petroleum's 1PointFive.

Radio and television
, the Texans' flagship radio stations were KILT SportsRadio 610AM and KILT 100.3FM. The AM station has an all-sports format, while the FM station plays contemporary country music. Both are owned by Audacy. Marc Vandermeer is the play-by-play announcer. Heisman Trophy winner Andre Ware provides color commentary, and SportsRadio 610 host Rich Lord serves as the sideline reporter. Preseason and regular season Monday night games from ESPN are telecast by KTRK, an ABC owned and operated station. Kevin Kugler calls the preseason games on TV, with former Oilers running back Spencer Tillman providing color commentary. Regular season games are aired over CBS affiliate KHOU, FOX affiliate KRIV if the Texans host an NFC team, and NBC affiliate KPRC for Sunday night games.

Spanish-language radio broadcasts of the team's games are aired on KGOL ESPN Deportes 1180AM. Enrique Vásquez is the play-by-play announcer. José Jojo Padrón provides color commentary, and Fernando Hernández serves as sideline reporter.

Radio affiliates

Texans Radio Affiliates

See also 
 List of Houston Texans seasons

Notes and references

External links

 
 Houston Texans at the National Football League official website

 
National Football League teams
American football teams established in 2002
2002 establishments in Texas